Westside Christian High School is a private Christian High School located in Tigard, Oregon, United States.

History
In 1981, with 10 students and 6 teachers, Westside Christian High School opened its doors in the vacant Collins View School building (now Riverdale High School) to serve families on the west side of town. In 1992 after a collaborative effort with Lake Bible Church, a new combined church and high school structure was built on the corner of Kruse Way and Carman Drive in Lake Oswego, Oregon.

In 2011, the school announced plans to move to Tigard and a new, larger campus where they planned to eventually grow their enrollment to 450 students. The school received a $1 million grant from the M.J. Murdock Charitable Trust to help pay for the new location.

In February 2013, Westside purchased the property at the intersection of Highway 99 and 217, just twenty minutes south of downtown Portland. They moved into their new campus in January 2014.

Mission 
Inspiring godly transformation and Christ-like character through exceptional education and intentional discipleship to impact the world for Christ.

Academics

AP classes 
Westside offers 10 AP classes 
 AP Language & Composition
 AP Literature & Composition
 AP Calculus AB
 AP Biology 
 AP Physics
 AP European History
 AP US History
 AP World History
 AP Human Geography
 AP Studio Art

Concurrent credit classes 
Westside offers 12 concurrent credit classes

WCHS has partnerships with both Warner Pacific College (WPC) and Northwest Nazarene University (NNU) to offer concurrent high school and college credit through a selected group of classes, allowing students to obtain up to a total of 43 semester units. The following 11 classes (10 through WPC and 1 through NNU) are eligible for concurrent credit:

2017-18 Courses through Warner Pacific College (semester system)
 AP Literature & Composition will generate credit in En 120: Intro to Literature (3 credits)
 AP Language & Composition will generate credit in En 101: College Composition (3 credits)
 Pre-Calculus will generate credit in MA 115: Precalculus (4 credits)
 AP Calculus AB will generate credit in MA 251: Calculus 1 (4 credits)
 AP US History will generate credit in HIS 201: US History (3 credits)
 AP World History will generate credit in HIS 211: Survey of World History I (3 credits)
 AP European History will generate credit in HIS 212: Survey of World History II (3 credits)
 Anatomy & Physiology will generate credit in BIO 121: Intro to Anatomy & Physiology (4 credits)
 AP Biology will generate credit in BIO 102: General Biology II (4 credits)
 AP Physics will generate credit in PHS 121 Intro to Physics (4 credits)
 AP Chemistry
2017-18 Courses through Northwest Nazarene University (semester system)
 Spanish 4 will generate credit in SPAN 2010 & 2020 Intermediate Spanish (4 credits for each semester)
Historically, 90 - 95% of Westside students attend 4-year colleges after graduating. 95% of all WCHS teachers have a master's degree and/or their teaching credential.

Accreditation and memberships
 AdvancED (Northwest Accreditation Commission)
 Oregon Schools Athletic Association
 Pacific Northwest Association for College Admission Counseling

Athletics
Westside competes in Oregon's 3A Lewis & Clark League and currently offers 8 unique sports across 3 seasons.

Fall:
 Cross Country
 Soccer
 Girls Volleyball

Winter:
 Basketball
 Girls Cheerleading

Spring:
 Track & Field
 Boys Golf
 Girls Tennis

Performing arts
Westside's choir program has won the OSAA 3A State Championship for thirteen consecutive years, from 2007 to 2019. Westside students also perform two to three full-length drama productions at the Alpenrose Dairy opera house each year.

References

External links
 Official website

Tigard, Oregon
High schools in Washington County, Oregon
Educational institutions established in 1981
Christian schools in Oregon
Private high schools in Oregon
1981 establishments in Oregon